Begum Mumtaz Jehan Mirza (Urdu: ممتاز مرزا) was a noted Urdu poet. Her work was heavily influenced by Persian literature. She won the Padma Shri in the Literature and Education field in the year 1976. Her most notable work is "Yadon ke Saye." She worked at the Iran Cultural House, Delhi.

References

1939 births
1997 deaths
Sindhi-language writers
People from Hyderabad, Sindh